Bobby is a surname. Notable people with the surname include:

 Amjad Bobby (1942–2005), Pakistani composer
 Anne Bobby (born 1967), American actress

See also
 Bobby (disambiguation)